Mohsenabad (also Romanized as Moḩsenābād) is a village in Ordughesh Rural District, Zeberkhan District, Nishapur County, Razavi Khorasan Province, Iran. At the 2006 census, its population was 850, in 220 families.

References 

Populated places in Nishapur County